Ab Chahru (also Romanized as Āb Chahrū and Āb-e Chahrū; also known as Āb Chārū and Rūstā-ye Shahīd Kāz̧emī) is a village in Abezhdan Rural District, Abezhdan District, Andika County, Khuzestan Province, Iran. At the 2006 census, its population was 278, in 40 families.

References 

Populated places in Andika County